Scott Beck  is an American politician who has served in the Vermont House of Representatives since 2015.

References

Living people
University of Washington alumni
The Citadel, The Military College of South Carolina alumni
21st-century American politicians
Republican Party members of the Vermont House of Representatives
Year of birth missing (living people)